SlugOS is common source base for a group of firmware distributions for the Linksys NSLU2.

SlugOS
SlugOS comprises:
SlugOS/BE (née OpenSlug) - Big Endian
SlugOS/LE (née DebianSlug) - Little Endian
UcSlugC

SlugOS/BE
SlugOS/BE is the Big Endian version of the SlugOS alternative firmware for the Linksys NSLU2.

SlugOS/LE
SlugOS/LE is the Little Endian version of the SlugOS alternative firmware for the Linksys NSLU2.

See also
Unslung

External links
SlugOS HomePage

NSLU2-Linux